MV Catriona is a pioneering diesel electric hybrid passenger and vehicle roll-on, roll-off ferry built for Caledonian MacBrayne for the Claonaig–Lochranza crossing. She is the third hybrid ferry commissioned and owned by Caledonian Maritime Assets, one of three such ferries in the world to incorporate a low-carbon hybrid system of diesel electric and lithium ion battery power.

History
Catriona was launched on 11 December 2015 at Ferguson Marine Engineering in Port Glasgow by Mrs Anna Østergaard, wife of CMAL chairman Erik Østergaard. Catriona is the first ship to be built at the Ferguson yard following its purchase by Clyde Blowers Capital.

The ships in the hybrid fleet are named after Scottish literature. The first, entered service on the Sconser to Raasay route in October 2013. The second,  entered service on the Tarbert to Portavadie route in 2014. Catriona is a novel written by Robert Louis Stevenson in 1893.

Catriona was awarded ‘Electric & Hybrid Propulsion System of the Year’ in 2016.

Layout
Catriona can accommodate 150 passengers, 23 cars or 2 HGVs. In addition, two lithium-ion battery banks with a total of 700kWh are also available to supply power to the units. The battery banks will be charged overnight from the mains. It is anticipated that renewable energy sources will be used to charge the batteries in future, further reducing the carbon footprint.

Experience has shown that hybrid vessels can reduce fuel consumption by up to 38% compared with a conventionally powered vessel of the same size. This will result in a decrease in CO2 emissions in excess of 5,500 tonnes per vessel over their lifetime, with a similar decrease in sulphur and nitrogen oxide emissions.

Service
CalMac's hybrid ferries are designed to operate on many of the short crossing routes around the Clyde and Hebrides. Catriona displaced  on the Claonaig-Lochranza crossing to meet increasing demand on this route in 2016.

In June 2017,  provided additional sailings on the Claonaig-Lochranza route alongside Catriona while  was away at James Watt Dock for emergency repairs. 

In January 2018, Catriona was the relief vessel on the Largs-Cumbrae ferry crossing while  went for overhaul.

In March 2019, Catriona operated a shuttle service on the Claonaig-Lochranza crossing after  sustained damage to her bow visor as a result of ramming the pier at Brodick.

References

External links
 MV Catriona on calmac.co.uk

Caledonian MacBrayne
2015 ships
Ships built on the River Clyde